Biswo Ghatna (विश्व घटना) means world events. It is the name of a weekly show on Nepal Television hosted by Mr. Durga Nath Sharma and occasionally by other hosts.

Plot 
The show contained clips of different interesting events all around the world. The show was probably the first show of its kind on Nepal Television.

Music 
This show used the music of the song "White Wedding" by Billy Idol as the theme music.

References 

Nepalese television series
Nepalese television sitcoms